The siege of Kut Al Amara (7 December 1915 – 29 April 1916), also known as the first battle of Kut, was the besieging of an 8,000 strong British Army garrison in the town of Kut,  south of Baghdad, by the Ottoman Army. In 1915, its population was around 6,500. Following the surrender of the garrison on 29 April 1916, the survivors of the siege were marched to imprisonment at Aleppo, during which many died. Historian Christopher Catherwood has called the siege "the worst defeat of the Allies in World War I". Ten months later, the British Indian Army, consisting almost entirely of newly recruited troops from Western India, conquered Kut, Baghdad and other regions in between in the Fall of Baghdad.

Prelude

The 6th (Poona) Division of the Indian Army, under Major-General Charles Townshend, had fallen back to the town of Kut after retreating from Ctesiphon. The British Empire forces arrived at Kut around 3 December 1915. They had suffered significant losses, numbering only 11,000 soldiers (plus cavalry). General Townshend chose to stay and hold the position at Kut instead of continuing the march downriver towards Basra. Contained within a long river loop, Kut offered a good defensive position although supply lines from distant Basra were stretched.

The siege

The pursuing Ottoman forces under Halil Pasha arrived on 7 December 1915. Once it became clear the Ottomans had enough forces to lay siege to Kut, Townshend ordered his cavalry to escape south, which it did, led by Lieut. Colonel Gerard Leachman. The Ottoman forces numbered around 11,000 men and were increasing steadily with additional reinforcements arriving constantly. They were commanded by the respected but elderly German general and military historian Baron von der Goltz. Goltz knew the Ottoman army well, as he had spent 12 years working on modernizing it, from 1883 to 1895. After three attacks in December, Goltz directed the building of siege fortifications facing Kut. He prepared for an attack from Basra, using the Tigris River, by building defensive positions further down the river designed to cut off a river-borne relief.

After a month of siege, Townshend wanted to break out and withdraw southwards but his commander, General Sir John Nixon saw value in tying down the Ottoman forces in a siege. Nixon had ordered transports from London, but none had arrived. The War Office was in the process of reorganizing military command; previously the orders had come from the Viceroy and India Office.

However, when Townshend—inaccurately—reported that only one month of food remained, a rescue force was hastily raised. It is not clear why Townshend reported he only had enough food for one month when he actually had food for more than four months (although at a reduced level), but Townshend would not attempt an infantry retreat unprotected through hostile tribal lands without river transport. Nixon had ordered this with reinforcements, commanded by his son, but by December they were still only in the Suez Canal. The confusing communications would prove a critical delay.

Medical facilities in Kut were headed by Major General Patrick Hehir.

Relief expeditions
The first relief expedition comprised some 19,000 men under Lieutenant-General Aylmer and it headed up the river from Ali Gharbi in January 1916.

Battle of Sheikh Sa'ad

The first attempt to relieve Kut (the Battle of Sheikh Sa'ad) came on 6 January by troops under the command of Major-General George Younghusband. Troops under Lieut. Gen. Aylmer's command joined the British forces with two brigades the next day following which Aylmer took over the command. Part of the cause of delay was the debate in Cabinet over whether one division would be an adequate force, or whether two divisions should be sent. Deliberations were painfully slow. The ageing General Maurice insisted on being informed at every turn as the evidence came into the Committee of Imperial Defence; which was further complicated by a restructuring involving the setup of a new sub-committee system and transfer of military responsibilities. At least three urgent memoranda were sent from General Nixon demanding transports to evacuate Townshend's division. By Christmas his health had broken down, and he requested a return to Bombay.

Nixon's replacements with additional staff as a mandatory requirement moved forward from Ali Al Gharbi towards Sheikh Sa'ad along both banks of the Tigris. British efforts to defeat the Ottomans were unsuccessful.

The following day, on 7 January, Aylmer arrived with the main body of his forces and ordered a general attack. Younghusband led the attack on the left bank and Major-General Kemball took the right. After heavy fighting all day, Kemball's troops had overrun Ottoman trenches on the right bank, taking prisoners and capturing two guns. However, the Ottoman left bank held firm and they carried out supporting manoeuvres from the north.

After little change on 8 January, renewed British attacks on 9 January resulted in the Ottomans retiring from Sheikh Sa'ad. Over the following two days the Ottomans were followed by Aylmer's force but heavy rains made the roads virtually impassable.

Battle of Wadi

The Ottomans made their camp beyond the Wadi and on the other side of the Tigris opposite the Wadi.

On 13 January, Aylmer attacked the Ottoman Wadi position on the left bank with all of his forces. After putting up a stiff resistance the Ottomans retreated  to the west and they were followed by Aylmer's troops.

Battle of Hanna

The Ottomans then made their camp upstream of the Wadi at the Hanna defile, a narrow strip of dry land between the Tigris and the Suwaikiya Marshes. British losses at the Battle of Hanna amounted to 2,700 killed and wounded, which was disastrous for the garrison in Kut.

Later efforts
At this point, Khalil Pasha (the Ottoman commander of the whole region) came to the battle, bringing with him a further 20,000 to 30,000 reinforcements.

Following the defeat of Aylmer's expedition, General Nixon was replaced as supreme commander by Percy Lake on 19 January. More forces were sent to bolster Aylmer's troops. He tried again, attacking the Dujaila redoubt on 8 March. This attack failed, at a cost of 4,000 men. General Aylmer was dismissed and replaced with General George Gorringe on 12 March.

In April, starvation within the British garrison at Kut forced Indian troops to abandon the vegetarian diet of their religion and eat horse meat.

The relief attempt by Gorringe is usually termed the first battle of Kut. The British Empire's forces numbered about 30,000 soldiers, roughly equal to the Ottomans. The battle began on 5 April and the British soon captured Fallahiya but with heavy losses, Bait Isa was taken on 17 April. The final effort was against Sannaiyat on 22 April. The Allies were unable to take Sannaiyat and suffered some 1,200 casualties in the process.

In April 1916 No. 30 Squadron of the Royal Flying Corps carried out the first air supply operation in history. Food and ammunition were dropped to the defenders of Kut, but "as often as not their parcels go into the Tigris or into the Turkish trenches!" and the food rations provided between the 11 and 29 April were only enough for three days. 

All the relief efforts had failed, at a cost of around 30,000 Allied killed or wounded. Ottoman casualties are believed to have been around 10,000. The Ottomans also lost the aid of Baron von der Goltz. He died in April 1916, supposedly of typhoid about a week before the British surrendered on 29 April. After Goltz's death, no German commander took his place in Mesopotamia for the rest of the war.

Surrender of the British army

British leaders attempted to buy their troops out. Aubrey Herbert and T. E. Lawrence were part of a team of officers sent to negotiate a secret deal with the Ottomans. The British offered £2 million (equivalent to £ million in ) and promised they would not fight the Ottomans again, in exchange for Townshend's troops. Enver Pasha at first pretended to negotiate in good faith, then publicized and rejected the offer as a final humiliation to the British.

The British also asked for help from the Russians. General Baratov, with his largely Cossack force of 20,000, was in Persia at the time. Following the request he advanced towards Baghdad in April 1916, but he turned back when news reached him of the surrender.

General Townshend arranged a ceasefire on the 26th and, after failed negotiations, he simply surrendered on 29 April 1916 after a siege of 147 days. Around 13,000 Allied soldiers survived to be made prisoners. Historian İlber Ortaylı states that "Halil Pasha acted like a gentleman to the surrendering British officers" and offered "to take the POWs up towards the north in river boats in case fuel could be provided from British bases nearby." The offer was rejected by the British. However, historian Marc Ferro suggested a different image. According to Ferro, the surrendered British and Indian forces were forced to march around the city of Baghdad while being maltreated by the Ottoman troops supervising their march.

After the surrender, the Ottomans agreed to an exchange of sick and wounded soldiers for an equal number of POWs of the Ottoman Empire that were held by the British. Around 1,500 incapacitated prisoners were exchanged. The Anglo-Indian sick and wounded were taken to hospitals by ships and barges of the Tigris River. 

Townshend himself was taken to the island of Heybeliada on the Sea of Marmara, to sit out the war in relative luxury. The author Norman Dixon, in his book On the Psychology of Military Incompetence, described Townshend as being "amused" by the plight of the men he had deserted, as if he had pulled off some clever trick. Dixon says Townshend was unable to understand why his friends and comrades were ultimately censorious over his behaviour.

In British Army battle honours, the siege of Kut is named as "Defence of Kut Al Amara".

Aftermath

Jan Morris, a British historian, described the loss of Kut as "the most abject capitulation in Britain's military history." After this humiliating loss, General Lake and General Gorringe were removed from command. The new commander was General Maude, who trained and organized his army and then launched a successful campaign.

Ten months after the Siege of Kut, the British Indian Army conquered the whole region from Kut to Baghdad as part of the Fall of Baghdad on 11 March 1917. With Baghdad captured, the British administration undertook vital reconstruction of the war-torn country and Kut was slowly rebuilt.

Some of the Indian prisoners of war from Kut later came to join the Ottoman Indian Volunteer Corps under the influence of Deobandis of the Silk Letter Movement and with the encouragement of the German High Command. These soldiers, along with those recruited from the prisoners from the European battlefields, fought alongside Ottoman forces on a number of fronts. The Indians were led by Amba Prasad Sufi, who during the war was joined by Kedar Nath Sondhi, Rishikesh Letha, and Amin Chaudhry. These Indian troops were involved in the capture of the frontier city of Karman and the detention of the British consul there, and they also successfully harassed Sir Percy Sykes' Persian campaign against the Baluchi and Persian tribal chiefs who were aided by the Germans.

See also 

Second Battle of Kut, which took place on 23 February 1917.

References

Sources
 - Total pages: 679

Further reading

External links
The siege of Kut-al-Amara, to 29 April 1915 – from the website The Long, Long Trail, downloaded January 2006.
A Kut Prisoner by H. C. W. Bishop – e-book and HTML version with maps and graphics from Project Gutenberg.

Kut
Kut
1915 in Ottoman Iraq
1916 in Ottoman Iraq
Kut
Kut
Kut
Kut 1
Kut
Kut
Kut
Kut
December 1915 events
January 1916 events
February 1916 events
March 1916 events
April 1916 events